This is a list of senators from the state of South Australia since Australian Federation in 1901.

List

Senators, South Australia